Soma may refer to:

Businesses and brands
 SOMA (architects), a New York–based firm of architects
 Soma (company), a company that designs eco-friendly water filtration systems
 SOMA Fabrications, a builder of bicycle frames and other bicycle parts and accessories
 Soma Festival, annual music and well-being festival in Northern Ireland
 Soma, a brand of Chico's

Computing
 SOMA Messenger, a cross-platform instant messaging and communication application
 Service-oriented modeling and architecture, a framework for software design

Music

Bands and labels
 Soma (band), an Australian dark ambient musical project
 Soma (studio), a recording studio located in Chicago, Illinois
 Soma Records (U.S. label), a Minneapolis record label
 Soma Quality Recordings, a Scottish record label co-founded by Slam

Albums
 Soma (Mallavoodoo album) (2006)
 Soma (Steve Roach and Robert Rich album) (1992)
 Soma (Windhand album) (2013)
 Soma, a 2004 album by Eths
Soma, a 2021 album by Phaeleh

Songs
 "Soma" (song), a 1993 song by the Smashing Pumpkins
 "Soma", a 2009 song by Deadmau5 from For Lack of a Better Name
 "Soma", a 2015 song by Northlane from Node
 "Soma", a 2002 song by Project 86 from Truthless Heroes
 "Soma", a 2007 song by Prometheus from Corridor of Mirrors
 "Soma", a 2001 song by the Strokes from Is This It
 "Soma", a 2012 song by 10 Years from Minus the Machine
 "Soma", a 1984 song by Tuxedomoon

Organizations
 A.T. Still University School of Osteopathic Medicine in Arizona, one of three medical schools in Arizona
 Sharing of Ministries Abroad, an international Anglican charity
 Society of Mutual Autopsy, a professional association of anthropologists
 Student Osteopathic Medical Association, a national student organization of osteopathic medical students
 Symphony Orchestra Musician Association, part of the Media, Entertainment and Arts Alliance, Australia

People
 Stephen O'Malley or SOMA (born 1974), experimental musician and graphic designer
 Queen Soma, legendary founder of Kingdom of Funan in the 1st century
 Leela Soma, Scottish-based writer, born in Madras
 Soma Sara, founder of Everyone's Invited, an anti-rape organisation based in the UK

Fictional
 Soma, the freely distributed happiness drug in Brave New World
 Soma, a character in Is It Wrong to Try to Pick Up Girls in a Dungeon?
 Prince Soma, a character in Black Butler
 Soma Cruz, the protagonist of Castlevania: Aria of Sorrow and Castlevania: Dawn of Sorrow
 Soma Peries, a character in Mobile Suit Gundam 00
 Soma Schicksal, a character in Gods Eater Burst
 Soma Yukihira, the main protagonist in Food Wars!: Shokugeki no Soma
 Jarlskona Soma, a character in Assassin's Creed: Valhalla
 Ryu Soma, a character in Argento Soma

Places

 South Main, part of Main Street (Vancouver) in Vancouver, British Columbia, Canada
 Soma, Gambia, a town
 Sama, South Khorasan or Somā, Iran
 Sōma, Aomori, a village in Nakatsugaru District, Aomori Prefecture, Japan
 Sōma, Fukushima, a city in Fukushima Prefecture, Japan
 Sōma District, Fukushima, a district in Fukushima Prefecture, Japan
 Soma, Manisa, a town and district of Manisa Province, Turkey
 South of Market, San Francisco or SoMa, a neighborhood in San Francisco, California, U.S
 SoMa, the 4th arrondissement part of Le Marais in Paris, France

Religion 
 Soma (deity), a Hindu deity
 Soma (drink), a ritual drink in Indo-Iranian cultures

Science 
 Soma (biology), the cell body of a neuron
 Carisoprodol or Soma, a muscle relaxant drug

Other uses 
 Sōma (surname)
 Soma (video game), a 2015 survival horror science fiction video game
 System Open Market Account, a monetary policy tool used by the US Federal Reserve System
 Soma cube, a solid dissection puzzle invented by Piet Hein
 Soma San Diego, a concert venue in San Diego, California
 System Open Market Account, a pool of financial assets owned & operated by the US Federal Reserve, held as an emergency store of liquidity and used as collateral against liabilities
 "Soma", an item in the Megami Tensei video game series.

See also
 Malmheim og Soma, a borough of Sandnes, Norway
 Som (disambiguation)
 Sōma (disambiguation)
 Sōma clan, a Japanese clan of Mutsu Province from the 16th century
 Soma 0.5mg, a 2018 album by Taconafide
 SomaFM, a listener-supported, commercial-free Internet radio station
 Somatherapy, also Soma or SOMA, a therapy designed by Brazilian Roberto Freire
 Somatic (disambiguation)